Yhonastan Fabian (born March 18, 1984 in Monte Plata), is a male volleyball and beach volleyball coach as well as a former player from the Dominican Republic, who participated with La Romana in the 2013 FIVB Club World Championship as assistant coach.

Career
He participated with his national team in the 2006 Central American and Caribbean Games, 2007 NORCECA Championship and the 2007 America's Cup. His team finished fourth, fifth and sixth, out of the medals. He played in the 2008 NORCECA Pre-Olympic Championship as a libero, and wearing the #14 jersey. His team finished in the 6th place.

At the Dominican Republic Volleyball League he was runner-up with Bahoruco at the 2008 league  championship, after played with Monte Plata in the preliminary round.

In Beach Volleyball, he participated in the NORCECA Beach Volleyball Circuit 2009 with William Sánchez, earning the 11th position.

Fabian served as assistant coach for his senior national team for the 2014 FIVB World Championship NORCECA qualification tournament#Pool C pool C in 2012 in Santo Domingo.
He then coached for his U23 national team in the same position for the 2013 FIVB U23 World Championship and later for the Dominican professional club La Romana in the 2013 FIVB Club World Championship, when her team ended up in tied seventh place.

Clubs
  Bahoruco (2008)
  Monte Plata (2008

References

External links
 

1984 births
Living people
Dominican Republic men's volleyball players
Dominican Republic beach volleyball players
Men's beach volleyball players